Events from the year 1806 in France.

Incumbents
 Emperor – Napoleon I

Events
6 February - Battle of San Domingo, British naval victory over French squadron.
February - France invades the Kingdom of Naples.
26 February - Siege of Gaeta begins: French besiege Neapolitan forces.
10 March - Battle of Campo Tenese: Decisive French victory over Neapolitan forces.
8 April - Marriage of Stéphanie de Beauharnais, adopted daughter of Napoleon Bonaparte, to Prince Karl Ludwig Friedrich of Baden.
5 June - Louis Bonaparte is appointed as king of Holland by his brother Napoleon.
4 July - Battle of Maida: British tactical victory over French forces.
18 July - Siege of Gaeta ends as French artillery breaks through the city's defences.
 6 August - Napoleon dissolves the Holy Roman Empire
September - Prussia declares war on France, and is joined by Saxony and other minor German states.
9 October - Battle of Schleiz: French victory over Prussia.
10 October - Battle of Saalfeld: French victory over Prussian forces.
14 October - Battle of Jena-Auerstedt: Decisive French victory over Prussia.
24 October - French forces enter Berlin.
6 November - Battle of Lübeck: French victory over Prussian forces.
21 November - Berlin Decree, issued by Napoleon, forbidding the import of British goods into European countries allied with or dependent upon France.
24 November - The last major Prussian field force surrenders to the French near Lübeck.
30 November - Napoleon captures Warsaw.
11 December - Treaty of Poznań ends the war between France and Saxony (Prussia's ally).
26 December - Battle of Pułtusk: Inconclusive battle leading to Russian retreat.
26 December - Battle of Golymin: Russian forces disengage successfully from superior French forces.

Births
13 January - Michel Chevalier, engineer, statesman and economist (died 1879)
1 February - François Jouffroy, sculptor (died 1882)
10 April - Juliette Drouet, actress (died 1883)
30 April - Charles Théodore Colet, Roman Catholic Archbishop (died 1883)
21 July - Louis Victor Leborgne, also known as Tan, patient of Paul Broca (died 1861)
12 August - Adolphe Granier de Cassagnac, journalist and politician (died 1880)
28 October - Alphonse Pyrame de Candolle, botanist (died 1893)
3 December - Jacques-Marie-Achille Ginoulhiac, Bishop (died 1875)

Deaths
2 February - Nicolas-Edme Rétif, novelist (born 1734)
22 April - Pierre-Charles Villeneuve, naval officer (born 1763)
23 June - Mathurin Jacques Brisson, zoologist and natural philosopher (born 1723)
22 August - Jean-Honoré Fragonard, painter and printmaker (born 1732)
23 August - Charles-Augustin de Coulomb, physicist (born 1736)
9 September - Gui-Jean-Baptiste Target, lawyer and politician (born 1733)

See also

References

1800s in France